The tournament was held between January 2 and January 12, 2008. Eight teams competed for two Copa Libertadores 2008 spots in this tournament.

Venues

Qualification 
Once the  2006-07 season was ended, the clubs that participate in the InterLiga were defined:

2006–07 standings

Group stage

Group A 

 Due to Atlas and Toluca being equal in Wins, Losses, Goals For and Against and Points. The way they decided who qualified to the final round was by a flip of a coin, which was done by Bruno Marioni of Atlas with a sinco peso coin.

Group B

Final 

Matches at Home Depot Center, Carson, California

Goalscorers 
The scorers from the InterLiga 2008

Match schedule 
Matches at Pizza Hut Park (Frisco, Texas)

Matches at Robertson Stadium (Houston, Texas)

Matches at The Home Depot Center (Carson, California)

References

External links 
Official site (in Spanish and English)

Inter
Interliga